Prombank Dormitory is a constructivist building in Tsentralny City District of Novosibirsk, Russia, built in 1927 by architect I. A. Burlakov. It is located on the corner of Krasny Avenue and Kainskaya Street.

See also
 Gosbank Building
 Kuzbassugol Building Complex

References

Tsentralny City District, Novosibirsk
Buildings and structures in Novosibirsk
Residential buildings completed in 1927
Constructivist architecture
1927 establishments in Russia
Cultural heritage monuments of regional significance in Novosibirsk Oblast